The 1958 United States Senate election in Florida was held on November 4, 1958. 

After fending off a primary challenge from former senator Claude Pepper, the incumbent senator Spessard Holland was easily re-elected to a third term in office.

Democratic primary

Candidates
 Spessard L. Holland, incumbent senator
 Claude Pepper, former senator

Campaign
The incumbent senator Holland, a firm conservative, was challenged by former senator Claude Pepper, who had been unseated in 1950. Holland had played a role in recruiting George A. Smathers to run against the liberal Pepper in that election. The two served as colleagues in the Senate from 1947 to 1951.

Results

Republican primary

Candidates
 Leland Hyzer, nominee for Florida's 4th congressional district in 1956

Results
Hyzer was unopposed for the Republican nomination.

General election

Results

See also 
 1958 United States Senate elections

References 

1958
Florida
United States Senate